Casefile True Crime Podcast, or simply Casefile, is an Australian crime podcast that first aired in January 2016 and is hosted by an Australian man who remains anonymous. The podcast is released on a Sunday (EST) for three consecutive weeks, with a break on the fourth week. The series deals with solved or cold criminal cases, often related to well-known murders and serial crimes. Many early episodes relate to Australian cases (e.g. Port Arthur or the Snowtown murders), although notable crimes from the UK and the US are increasingly featured, and well-known cases from other countries have also been included. Unlike a number of similar podcasts, the series is scripted and narrative, relying primarily on original police or mass-media documents, eyewitness accounts, and interview or public announcement recordings. Larger and more-complex cases have received multiple-week serialised broadcasts, and case updates to previously aired cases are also provided from time to time. The series has been well received, and has won a number of awards since its debut.

Production 
Casefile first aired on 9 January 2016 and was conceived by an anonymous Australian host who started producing the show in 2015 in his spare room. The host had just had surgery and was listening to a lot of podcasts and true-crime shows (e.g. The Joe Rogan Experience, Hardcore History, Serial, and Making A Murderer) at the time, and felt encouraged by Joe Rogan to make his own based on in-depth research and a storytelling style. According to one source, the host remains anonymous because "he wants the stories, facts, and questions to speak for themselves" and "It makes the show about the stories and that's it." According to another review, the podcast's:deliberately sparse production value became its strongest asset, plunging listeners into a pool of ambient silence with a host neither named nor contextualized. ... the podcast does not go the typical route of parading listeners through a montage of primary source material like evening news reports or interviews with now-wizened investigators; instead, the stories are unfolded slowly and methodically by the anonymous host, with just enough editorializing to make it feel like a friend or a witness is relaying the tale.

In its current format, the 2021 Casefile team consists of the host/narrator, two composers, a creative director, a digital media/designer, and four researcher/writers. It has also had a producer, Mike Migas, “since about episode 7”, which led to the first six episodes being reworked. Researchers have also travelled internationally to access primary resources in some cases, such as former researcher and co-writer Anna Priestland, who travelled from Melbourne to visit the UK National Archives in Kew in 2017 to examine police files on Myra Hindley. A number of the more recent international cases have also been written and researched by the Australian author Eileen Ormsby.

Each case includes a corresponding page on the podcast's official homepage, which details information such as special thank yous, official support phone numbers and websites (for Australia, the UK, the US, Canada and New Zealand), other credits, and resources (such as books, websites, videos, documents, articles, maps, wanted posters, and suspect sketches), as in this example. Warnings are regularly given at the start of podcasts due to the graphic content. It is available via numerous sites.

One episode, Case 55 (Simone Strobel, released 15 July 2017), has been removed due to legal issues, although general details of the podcast itself are still publicly available. Others (Cases 19 (Snowtown) and 30 (The Claremont Serial Killer), both from 2016) have been temporarily removed with the intention of updating and/or improving them.

Episodes

Reception 
Along with the recent rise in true crime podcasting, as seen in Serial or S-Town, the series has been reviewed positively by several sources:

Rolling Stone (22 July 2016):As Casefile points out in their tagline, fact is scarier than fiction. But what the podcast might really prove is that fact is even scarier when told in a thick Australian accent – especially when accompanied by ambient, pulsing noise from a trio of professional sound designers and musicians. In each weekly episode, which can run anywhere from 20 minutes to an hour and a half, the narrator... calmly tells a story of a devastating Australian crime. The podcast expertly covers murder and abduction, sometimes walking the listener through the criminal's trial, and other times discussing potential theories for a crime whose perpetrator was never caught.Evening Standard (28 March 2017):The Australian-made show, which launched in January last year, has regularly featured in the UK’s top 10 podcasts on iTunes in recent months. It also regularly reaches the top 50 in the US chart, rising as high as fourth last July. ... Its mini-series on Yorkshire Ripper Peter Sutcliffe received 5.8 million downloads — the most for a single case since the launch. Its most popular single episode was on British tourist Peter Falconio ... [which] has more than 4.2 million downloads. A series covering the Moors Murders ... had more than a million downloads in four days.

By episode 99, the show was appearing "in the podcast charts in 107 different countries". Download statistics by iTunesChart.net state that Casefile has charted in the top 100 in 5 regions, with peak ranking positions of the podcast including: Australia (2), Canada (11), Germany (68), United Kingdom (11), and United States (7). In Australia, the podcast has consistently been in the top 10 since May 2016. Overall, as of July 2019, individual episodes have been downloaded more than 275 million times.

Awards 
 Apple Podcasts (Best of 2016, 2017, 2018, 2019, 2020)
 CastAway 2017 Australian Podcast Awards
 Discover Pods award (Most Innovative Podcast 2017)
 Off the Charts 2017
Spotify Podcasts of the Decade

Related podcasts

From the Files 

Early in the show's history, updates to cases were occasionally aired as breakthroughs or other significant events occurred. However, as the podcast evolved, these began to be placed behind a voluntary subscription paywall. In July 2019, it was announced that these updates would now be spun out into an "informal companion" series, From the Files, to be aired monthly in the show's off week. To replace it, a new patron only show called Behind the Files debuted the same month. It was announced in December 2019, however, that From the Files would be put on hiatus for 2020.

Other podcasts
A number of other podcasts have been produced and released by Casefile Presents:

 Silent Waves (2019)
 What's Missing (2020)
 The Vanishing of Vivienne Cameron (2020) - covered by Casefile in episode 80 (8 April 2018).
 Casefile True Crime – Edição Oficial em Português (2020-present) - Portuguese version
 Pseudocide (2021)
 The Invisible Hand (2021)
 The Labyrinth (2021)
 Searching For Sarah MacDiarmid (2021)
 Crime Interrupted (2022)
 The Detective’s Dilemma (2022)
 Matty (2022)

See also
Criminal (podcast)
List of Australian podcasts

References

External links 
 
 YouTube channel
 The Creator of Casefile Interview
 From the Files website

Infotainment
Audio podcasts
2016 podcast debuts
Investigative journalism
Australian podcasters
Australian crime podcasts
Australian podcasts